Panayapilly is a village in Ernakulam district near Fort Kochi in the Indian state of Kerala.

References 

Villages in Ernakulam district